Nezbudská Lúčka is a village and municipality in Žilina District in the Žilina Region of northern Slovakia.

History
In historical records the village was first mentioned in 1439.

Geography
The municipality lies at an altitude of 355 metres and covers an area of 8.211 km². It has a population of about 382 people.

External links
http://www.statistics.sk/mosmis/eng/run.html
http://nezbudskalucka.sk

Villages and municipalities in Žilina District